Shankar Dev was an Indian politician and three-time Member of Parliament in Lok Sabha (the lower house of the Parliament of India). He was also a Member of Hyderabad State Legislative Assembly and served as Deputy Minister and later Minister in former Hyderabad State from 1952 to 1956.

Early life and background 
Dev was born in Bidar, Karnataka in 1922. Balaji Rao was his father. He completed his education from Gurukul University, Hardwar and Agra University.

Personal life 
Shankar Dev married Padmavati in 1950 and the couple had two sons and three daughters.

Career 
He left politics and joined Sarvodaya and Bhoodan Movement along with Acharya Vinobaji from 1962 to 1971.

Position held 

 General Secretary - All India Depressed Classes League (1960–1962).

Awards 
Dev received a State award from the Govt of Karnataka for social service.

References 

1922 births
India MPs 1957–1962
India MPs 1971–1977
India MPs 1977–1979
Hyderabad State politicians
Living people